Höss is a German surname and can refer to several people including:

 Maria Crescentia Höss (1682–1744), Roman Catholic saint
 Otto Höss (1897–1971), Austrian football player
 Rudolf Höss (1901-1947), SS-Obersturmbannführer and commandant of Auschwitz concentration camp

See also
 Hoss (surname)
 Hess (surname)

German-language surnames